Esu or ESU may refer to:

People 
 Esu Niemelä (1921–1999), Finnish politician
 Ivara Esu (born 1951), Nigerian academic administrator
 Ozak Esu (born 1991), Nigerian engineer

Characters
 Eshu, a Yoruba divinity

Places 
 Essaouira-Mogador Airport, in Morocco

Entertainment and fiction 
 Class S (genre), a Japanese genre of girl's fiction

Education 
 East Stroudsburg University of Pennsylvania, USA
 Educational Service Units of Nebraska, USA
 Emporia State University in Kansas, USA

Groups and organizations 
 European Students' Union
 Emergency Service Unit, a police tactical unit
 Energy Services Union, an Irish trade union
 Explorer Scout Unit, of the Explorer Scouts
 English-Speaking Union, an international educational charity

Science and medicine
 Electrostatic units, a system of units
 Electrostatic unit, or statcoulomb, its unit of charge
 Evolutionarily significant unit
 Electrosurgical unit, used in electrosurgery

Other uses
 Central Alaskan Yup'ik language

See also

 Esus (disambiguation)